An executive president is the head of state who exercises authority over the governance of that state, and can be found in presidential, semi-presidential, and parliamentary systems.

They contrast with figurehead presidents, common in most parliamentary republics, in which the president serves symbolic, nonpolitical roles (and often is appointed to office by parliament) while the prime minister holds all relevant executive power.  A small number of nations, like South Africa and Botswana, have both an executive presidency and a system of governance that is parliamentary in character, with the President elected by and dependent on the confidence of the legislature.  In these states, the offices of president and prime minister (as both head of state and head of government respectively) might be said to be combined.

The above examples notwithstanding, executive presidencies are found in presidential systems and semi-presidential systems.

In order to prevent the abuse of power, checks and balances are implemented through the legislative and judiciary bodies. For example, in the United States one method is impeachment whereby the president can be held accountable if others deem their actions unconstitutional, with the most recent example being the impeachment trials of President Donald Trump.

Elections 
In parliamentary republics, presidents are most commonly chosen by the legislature. However, in those countries with both a prime minister and a president, methods differ. For example, in Czechia a majority vote from the public elects the president.

In presidential and semi-presidential systems, the president is elected independently of the legislature. There are several methods in which to do this, including the plurality system and the two-round system. Whilst these methods use the popular vote, not all presidents are chosen in this way. For example, to be elected in the United States, a candidate must win a majority of the votes from the Electoral College - not the popular vote.

Contemporary examples

Presidential systems

Semi-presidential systems 

 
 
 
 
 
 
  *
 
 
 
 
 
 
 
 
 
 
 
 
 
 
 
 
 
 
 
 
 
 
 
 
 
 †

Parliamentary and related systems

Corporate example 
In the corporate environment, the head of a company is the Chief Executive Officer (CEO), with the president being second in command. Leading the company's executive group rather than the overall company, the executive president in this instance is responsible for day-to-day operations. In small businesses, the CEO and executive president are the same, whereas in larger companies the roles are carried out by two separate people.

See also 
 Presidential system
 Semi-presidential system
 Parliamentary republics
 Corporate governance

Notes

References 

Heads of state